The 1977 Camel GT Challenge season was the 7th season of the IMSA GT Championship auto racing series.  The series was for GTO and GTU class Grand tourer racing cars.  It began February 5, 1977, and ended October 26, 1977, after sixteen rounds.

Schedule
Both classes did not participate together in some events.  Races marked with Both had both classes on track at the same time.

Season results

Notes
 The race was won overall by Peter Gregg in a Group 5 Porsche 935.  Haywood and Hagestad finished 4th overall.

External links
 World Sports Racing Prototypes - 1977 IMSA GT Championship results

IMSA GT Championship seasons
IMSA GT